Mehdiabad (also Romanized as Mehdīābād) is a village in Aq Bolagh Rural District, Sojas Rud District, Khodabandeh County, Zanjan Province, Iran. At the 2006 census, its population was 414, in 79 families.

References 

Populated places in Khodabandeh County